Two Sons of Trinity is a 1972  Italian western-comedy film written and directed by Osvaldo Civirani and starring the comic duo Franco and Ciccio.

Plot Summary

Franco and Ciccio are two cousins who, in the old West, have opened a service station, where they wash, and dry the horses for passing riders. They also opened a  bar for the passing riders as well.

Cast 

 Franco Franchi as Franco Trinità
 Ciccio Ingrassia as  Ciccio Trinità
 Anna Degli Uberti as  Calamity Jane
 Lucretia Love as  Lola
 Franco Ressel as  Armstrong
 Goffredo Unger  as Father Superior
 Angelo Susani as  Chun Chin Champa
 Fortunato Arena as  Jack Gordon
 Artemio Antonini as  Friar
 Bruno Arié as  Ringo
 Remo Capitani as  Requiem
 Gilberto Galimberti as  Friar
 Fulvio Pellegrino as  Roger
 Osiride Pevarello as  Chun Chin Champa's Henchman
 Claudio Ruffini as  Sabata
 Pietro Torrisi as  Sartana

See also
 List of Italian films of 1972

References

External links

Spaghetti Western films
1970s Western (genre) comedy films
Films directed by Osvaldo Civirani
1972 comedy films
1972 films
Italian Western (genre) comedy films
1970s Italian-language films
1970s Italian films